Path is the second studio album by American shoegaze musician Kraus. It was released on March 9, 2018, via Terrible Records.

Release 
Kraus released "Reach" as a single of his second album Path on February 7, 2018. The album's second single, "Bum", was released eleven days later. Path released on March 9. He released a music video for "Bum" on June 6.

Reception and legacy 

Ian Cohen of Pitchfork gave a 7.3/10 review. Chicago Reader Leor Galil also talked positively about the album.

Far Out Magazine Carly Wu elected Path as the 18th best shoegaze album of all time, declaring that it is "unfailingly one of the most brilliant contemporary shoegaze albums ever" and that it ascends "to pure perfection".

Track listing 
"Figure"
"Bum"
"Games"
"Grow"
"Reach"
"Follow"
"Brief Skin"
"Outside"
"See"
"Big Blood"
"Watching"
"Mostly"

References 

2018 albums
Shoegaze albums by American artists